As a candidate country of the European Union, Serbia (RS) is in the process of being included in the Nomenclature of Territorial Units for Statistics (NUTS). However, due to the ongoing dispute with Kosovo, it has not yet agreed with the European Commission and Eurostat. The proposed three NUTS levels are:

Local administrative units

Below the NUTS levels, the two LAU (Local Administrative Units) levels are:

See also
 Administrative divisions of Serbia
 ISO 3166-2 codes of Serbia

Notes and references

External links
 Overview map of EU Countries - NUTS level 1

Serbia
Nuts